"Allegiance: Patriotic Song" is a World War I song first copyrighted on March 14, 1918.

Julia Smith composed this song for voice and piano. It was published in Boston, Massachusetts by D.W. Cooper Music Co. The cover, illustrated by E. S. Fisher, features a caption which reads, "Dedicated to the spirit of Americanism as typified by the immortal Lincoln.”

References

Bibliography
 Crew, Danny O. Presidential Sheet Music: An Illustrated Catalogue of Published Music Associated with the American Presidency and Those Who Sought the Office. Jefferson, N.C.: McFarland, 2001.   
 Vogel, Frederick G. World War I Songs: A History and Dictionary of Popular American Patriotic Tunes, with Over 300 Complete Lyrics. Jefferson: McFarland & Company, Inc., 1995. 

Songs of World War I
1918 songs
American patriotic songs